Farnham is a city in Brome-Missisquoi Regional County Municipality in the Estrie region of Quebec, Canada. The population as of the Canada 2021 Census was 10,149, making it the second most populated community in the RCM.

History 

The city of Farnham takes its name from the historic Township of Farnham. The latter is one of the few townships established before 1800, and was named in remembrance of Farnham, UK. The first "Farnhamiens", mostly Loyalists from the United States, arrived in 1800.

On December 28, 1876, Farnham got the status of "town". On March 8, 2000, the town of Farnham and the municipality of Rainville merged to form the new "City of Farnham". The total population is now numbered at 8,000 inhabitants.

Farnham is also the site of an important military training camp, used primarily by the Canadian Forces Leadership and Recruit School and local militia.

Geography 
Built on the shores of the Yamaska River, at the border of the Saint-Lawrence lowlands, the city of Farnham is located in the center of important cities such as Saint-Jean-sur-Richelieu (West) and Granby (North-East).

Demographics 

Attractions 
Petite Église - once an old church, the newly renovated building is now a fully functional recording studio, owned and operated by Montreal-based indie rock band Arcade Fire. The band announced on January 18, 2013, that they are selling the church they had been using as a studio. Other notable bands to have recorded at Petite Église include Wolf Parade and Hot Springs. The church is now owned by Emery Street Records, and continues to be used as a recording studio.

Activities 
Located in Farnham is a skydiving school, Nouvel Air. Farnham has an arena named in honour of Madeleine Auclair. Since the 1990s Farnham has had a skate board park, which hosts an annual festival every August named "Skatefest de Farnham". Southeast of Farnham is the golf course "Club de Golf de Farnham".

Farnham is on the route of both the Montérégiade Farnham/Granby and Route verte bicycle paths.

Transportation
Farnham is home to Farnham railway station, a disused station belonging to the Canadian Pacific Railway.

Notable people 
 In 2006, the members of the group Arcade Fire purchased the Petite Église, an old church that was renovated into a permanent recording studio for the band. After recording the albums Neon Bible and The Suburbs at the location, the band put the studio up for sale in 2013 citing "roof problems" as the cause for the sale.
 H. H. Bennett, photographer, was born in Farnham.
 Sylvain Charlebois, researcher and expert at Dalhousie University, was born in Farnham. He is the son of Farnham's first woman mayor, Lyse Lafrance-Charlebois (1991-2000).
 Simon Durivage, a known journalist in Province of Québec, was born in Farnham.
 Alain Forand, commanded the southern UNTAES forces in Croatia, and the Land Force Quebec Area during the Saguenay Flood operation and the Ice Storm of 1998.
 Ludger Lemieux, architect, was born in Farnham.
 Yvan Ponton, a known comedian in Province of Québec, was born in Farnham.
 Yves Rodier, comic strip creator, known for his many pastiches of The Adventures of Tintin, was born in Farnham.

See also
List of cities in Quebec
Municipal history of Quebec

References

External links 

Official web site

Cities and towns in Quebec
Incorporated places in Brome-Missisquoi Regional County Municipality